The birr is the unit of currency in Ethiopia. It is subdivided into 100 santim.

In 1931, Emperor Haile Selassie I formally requested that the international community use the name Ethiopia (as it had already been known internally for at least 1,600 years) instead of the exonym Abyssinia, and the issuing Bank of Abyssinia also became the Bank of Ethiopia. Thus, the pre-1931 currency could be considered the Abyssinian birr and the post-1931 currency the Ethiopian birr, although it was the same country and the same currency before and after.

186 billion birr were in circulation in 2008 ($14.7 billion or €9.97 billion).

History

First birr, 1800–1936

In the 18th and 19th centuries, Maria Theresa thalers and blocks of salt called "amole tchew" (አሞሌ) served as currency in Ethiopia. The thaler was known locally as the Birr (literally meaning "silver" in Ge'ez and Amharic) or talari (ታላሪ). The Maria Theresa thaler was officially adopted as the standard coin in 1855, although the Indian rupee and the Mexican dollar were also used in foreign trade.

The Ethiopian talari (thaler, dollar, birr) became the standard unit on 9 February 1893 and 200,000 dollars were produced at the Paris Mint in 1894 for Menelik II. The talari, equivalent to the Maria Theresa thaler, was divided into 20 ghersh (also guerche or gersh, from the Ottoman qirsh) or 40 bessa (a small copper coin).

A new Ethiopian coinage appeared about 1903. The new silver birr maintained the same weight and fineness as the old, but there was now a quarter-birr and a silver ghersh, the latter 1/16 the weight of the birr. The money of account now became 1 birr' = 16 ghersh = 32 bessa.

The Bank of Abyssinia was established in 1905 by Emperor Menelik and the European banking group behind the National Bank of Egypt; the bank was officially inaugurated by Menelik on 15 February 1906. The Ethiopian coinage gained acceptance only gradually, and Bank of Abyssinia imported Maria Theresa thalers. By the time World War I broke out, the bank was still importing about 1,200,000 of these coins annually. Bank of Abyssinia put banknotes into circulation in 1915. These notes were denominated birr in Amharic and thaler in English. They were used by merchants and by foreigners but were not initially accepted generally. However, Note circulation increased considerably after 1925.

Emperor Haile Selassie bought out the Bank of Abyssinia in 1931 for £235,000 in order to make it a purely Ethiopian institution. It was reorganized as Bank of Ethiopia. At the same time, the currency was decimalized and token nickel and copper coins were introduced, the birr becoming equal to 100 metonnyas (often written matonas). The text on the bank's notes appeared in Amharic, French, and English.

By the mid-1930s circulation consisted chiefly of Maria Theresa and Menelik talari.

Italian lira, 1936–41
Not long after the Italian occupation and the attempted transformation of Ethiopia into Italian East Africa, the Italian lira was introduced (15 July 1936) and Ethiopian banknotes were withdrawn from circulation at 3 lire per talar (birr). In an effort to increase the use of Italian paper money, the exchange rate for silver coin (Maria Theresa thalers) was raised to 4.50 lire, then to 5.00, and eventually, in stages, to 13.50. Still, many people kept their Ethiopian coins and banknotes.

Regular Italian coins and banknotes of Banca d'Italia circulated after 15 July 1936. Special notes with a red overprint were authorized for Italian East Africa on 12 September 1938, and a large quantity was printed. It is not clear, however, when, where, and to what extent these special notes actually circulated.

East African shilling, 1941–45
During the East African Campaign of 1941, British forces brought with them Indian, Egyptian, British, and British East African currency, and all were received in official payments. Italian coins and notes of up to 50 lire were allowed to continue in circulation to serve as small change; higher denominations were withdrawn at a rate of 24 lire per shilling. Maria Theresa thalers were allowed to circulate with a value of 1s d (or 45 lire). The East African shilling became the money of account on 1 July 1942; it eventually became the sole legal tender and remained so until 1945.

Regular notes of the East African Currency Board were used for circulation in Ethiopia.

Second birr, 1945–present
The birr was reintroduced in 1945 at a rate of 1 birr = 2 shillings. The name Ethiopian dollar was used in the English text on the banknotes. It was divided into 100 santim (derived from the French centime). The name birr became the official name, used in all languages, in 1976.

 Proposed Birr symbol 
There have been various proposals for a birr symbol, mostly based on the Ge'ez fidel ብ (bə). One suggested symbol comprises the bə with two horizontal slashes on the left hand side.

The symbol was created by Biniam under pseudonym "@dbeniam" on 21 April 2020 on Twitter page.

Coins

First birr
In 1931, a new series of coins was introduced consisting of copper 1 and 5 metonnyas, and nickel 10, 20 and 50 metonnyas.

Second birr
In 1944 (EE1936 in the Ethiopian calendar), coins were reintroduced, with copper 1, 5, 10 and 25 santim and silver 50 santim. A second series was issued in 1977 (EE1969). It consisted of aluminium 1 santim, brass 5 and 10 santim, cupro-nickel 25 and 50 santim, and bi-metallic 1 birr. The most recent issues are:
5 santim 2006 (EE1998)
10 santim 2004 (EE1996)
25 santim 2016 (EE2008; also called "semuni")
50 santim 2016 (EE2008)
 1 Birr'' 2016 (EE2008; bi-metallic)

The dates, like the rest of the legend, appear in Amharic, the official language of Ethiopia.

Identification and appearance
Besides having almost all the legends in Amharic, there are two features that help to immediately identify an Ethiopian birr. Early dated coins, those dated before 1977 (EE1969), feature a crowned rampant lion holding a cross. This can be seen in the adjacent picture. Later dated coins, those dated 1977 (EE1969) or after, picture the head of a roaring lion, with a flowing mane.

Coins were struck at several mints, including Paris, Berlin, and Addis Ababa. Coins without mintmarks were generally struck at Addis Ababa. The coins struck at Paris have either the mintmark "A" with the cornucopia and fasces privy marks, or the cornucopia and torch privy marks without the "A".

Banknotes

First birr
The Bank of Abyssinia introduced banknotes for 5, 10, 100 and 500 talari in 1915. 280,000 talari worth of notes was printed. The text on the notes was in Amharic and French. A 50-talari note was added in 1929, by which time over 1.5 million talari in notes were circulating.

The Bank of Ethiopia issued notes in 1932 in denominations of 5, 10, 50, 100 and 500 talari. A 2-talari note dated 1 June 1933 was issued in honour of the Imperial couple. By the end of 1934, some 3.3 million talari in notes were circulating.

Second birr

On 23 July 1945, notes were introduced by the State Bank of Ethiopia in denominations of 1, 5, 10, 50, 100 and 500 birr. The National Bank of Ethiopia was established by imperial proclamation 207 of 27 July 1963, and began operation on 1 January 1964. The National Bank of Ethiopia took over note production in 1966 and issued all denominations except for the 500 birr.

Banknotes have been issued in the following series:

2020 denominations

On 14 September 2020, Ethiopia announced the introduction of new banknotes of 10, 50, 100, and 200 birr, with the latter being issued into circulation to meet the needs of issuing a high denomination note to tackle inflation. Older issues of 10, 50, and 100 birr notes were demonetized in December. The federal government reported that over 113 billion birr equivalent to 3.6 billion $ remains hidden from the banks. The federal government also believes this money is being used as a catalyst to the current instability in Ethiopia. In just a month, Ethiopian banks gained 14 billion birr, around 500 million dollars into their system which is expected to increase as we head towards the end of 2020. The measure, announced by Prime Minister Abiy Ahmed, was reported as a preventative measure against hoarding, counterfeit and other corruption affecting the economic session. He also noted that the country spent 3.7 billion birr ($101.2 million) to print the new banknotes. Companies and individuals can cash only up to 1.5 million birr ($41,000). The cash withdrawal from banks should also not exceed 100,000 birrs ($2,737). The old 5-birr notes, while they will remain legal tender, will be replaced with a coin.

Ethiopian black market foreign currency exchange

Summary

See also
 Economy of Ethiopia

References

External links
 A gallery of the banknotes of Ethiopia

Birr
Currencies introduced in 1894